Chinonso Emeka (born 30 August 2001) is a Nigerian footballer.

Club career
He made his Belgian First Division A debut for Gent on 22 May 2021 in a game against Mechelen.

International career
He was included in the Nigeria's squad for the 2019 FIFA U-20 World Cup, but did not appear in any games.

References

External links
 

2001 births
Living people
Nigerian footballers
Association football forwards
K.A.A. Gent players
Belgian Pro League players
Nigerian expatriate footballers
Expatriate footballers in Belgium
Nigerian expatriate sportspeople in Belgium
Sportspeople from Warri